Abigail Adams (1744–1818) was the wife and closest advisor of U.S. President John Adams.

Abigail or Abbie Adams may also refer to:

Abigail Adams Smith (1765–1813), née Abigail Adams, daughter of President Adams and his wife, Abigail Adams
SS Abigail Adams, a Liberty ship
Abbie Adams (born 1990), American artist
Abbie Adams, character in Flood!

See also